The New River (Dutch: Nieuwe Rivier) is a river of South America. It forms the Western border of the Tigri Area, a disputed territory that is claimed by both Guyana and Suriname. From a Surinamese perspective it is also called the Upper Corantyne River.

The river rises in the Acarai Mountains and flows, together with the Coeroeni River, to the Courantyne River. The Oronoque River is a major tributary of the New River and within the Tigri Area. It was the location of a skirmish between Guyana Police Force and a Surinamese labor camp, 15 December 1967.

Military conflict broke out in August 1969 when members of the Guyana Defence Force launch an operation to clear Suriname military personnel from the area. The operation was named "Operation Climax" and was executed with maximum precision. 

Due to the surprise attack by the Guyana Defence Force the Suriname military ultimate decision was a hasty withdrawal, thus there were no deaths, only some POWs. This operation was one of the most successful ventures of the force.

Even though the area is disputed, it still attracts illegal mining. In 1993, the Guyana Defense Force identified alluvial mining by Brazilian nationals.

See also
List of rivers of Suriname
List of rivers of Guyana
Borders of Suriname

References

Rivers of the Tigri Area
Border rivers